Tyler Hansen (born December 6, 1989) is an American football quarterback who is currently a free agent. He was signed by the Cincinnati Bengals as an undrafted free agent in 2012. He played college football at the University of Colorado.

Hansen made his professional debut in 2014 with the Los Angeles KISS of the Arena Football League (AFL).

References

External links
Arena Football League bio

1989 births
Living people
American football quarterbacks
Colorado Buffaloes football players
Los Angeles Kiss players
Players of American football from California
Sportspeople from Escondido, California